A cisterna (plural cisternae) is a flattened membrane vesicle found in the endoplasmic reticulum and Golgi apparatus. Cisternae are an integral part of the packaging and modification processes of proteins occurring in the Golgi.

Function
Proteins begin on the cis side of the Golgi (the side facing the ER) and exit on the trans side (the side facing the plasma membrane). Throughout their journey in the cisterna, the proteins are packaged and are modified for transport throughout the cell. The number of cisterna in the Golgi stack is dependent on the organism and cell type. The structure, composition, and function of each of the cisternae may be different inside the Golgi stack. These different variations of Golgi cisternae are categorized into 3 groups; cis Golgi network,  medial, and trans Golgi network. The cis Golgi network is the first step in the cisternal structure of a protein being packaged, while the trans Golgi network is the last step in the cisternal structure when the vesicle is being transferred to either the lysosome, the cell surface or the secretory vesicle. The cisternae are shaped by the cytoskeleton of the cell through a lipid bilayer. Post-translational modifications such as glycosylation, phosphorylation and cleavage occur in the Golgi and as proteins travel through it, they go through the cisternae, which allows functional ion channels to be created due to these modifications. Each class of cisternae contains various enzymes used in protein modifications. These enzymes help the Golgi in glycosylation and phosphorylation of proteins, as well as mediate signal modifications to direct proteins to their final destination. Defects in the cisternal enzymes can cause congenital defects including some forms of muscular dystrophy, cystic fibrosis, cancer, and diabetes.

The trans-Golgi network is an important part of the Golgi. It is located on the trans face of the Golgi apparatus and is made up of cisternae. The cisternae play a crucial role in the packaging, modification, and transport functions for the cell overall. The proteins and polysaccharides that get processed here within the cisterna will then be sent to their specified locations.

There are multiple types of cisternae which can be recognized from their distinctions in morphology. These distinctions include enzymes relating to glycosylation that have been identified in cisternae located in different regions of the Golgi. This difference in the localization of enzymes throughout cisternae can contribute to the functioning of the Golgi by regulating the pH, ion concentrations, and the amounts of substrate that are necessary. This also works to make sure that reactions are happening in the correct places within the Golgi and that proteins do not undergo the wrong modification if they are in the wrong location.

The cis Golgi network is the first step in the cisternal structure of a protein being packaged, while the trans Golgi network is the last step in the cisternal structure when the vesicle is being transferred to either the lysosome, the cell surface or the secretory vesicle. The medial cisternae is where the mannose residue and extra N-acetylglucosamine is removed.

References

Organelles